Newton Harcourt is a village and former civil parish, now in the parish of Wistow, in the Harborough district, in the English county of Leicestershire, and lies 7 miles south-east of the city of Leicester on the northern ridge of the River Sence valley. In 1931 the parish had a population of 142.

Geography 
The village is situated on the northern ridge of the River Sence valley. The whole village is situated on Oadby Member Till that is underpinned by two Lower Jurassic bedrock geology Formations; Blue Lias mudstone (55-120 million years old) to the western half of the village, and Charmouth Mudstone (105-180 million years old) to the eastern half. The superficial deposits of the Oadby Member Till give way to Thrussington Member Till as you head south down into the Sence valley beyond St Luke's Church. Newton Harcourt is divided from its church by the Grand Union Canal's Leicester Arm and the Midland Main Line railway, both of which pass to the south of the main settlement.

History 
The oldest feature of the village will be St Luke's Church, originally a chapel, is a Grade II* listed building, with parts of its structure dating back to the 13th century. Other listed structures include: Hurst's Farmhouse, the Manor House, and the entrance gateway with Lodge, attached outbuilding and garden walls to the Manor House are all Grade II listed.

Newton Harcourt was formerly a township and chapelry in Wistow parish, from 1866 Newton Harcourt was a civil parish in its own right until it was abolished on 1 April 1936 and merged with Wistow, part also went to Oadby.

References

External links 
 Wistow cum Newton Harcourt Parish Council

Villages in Leicestershire
Former civil parishes in Leicestershire
Harborough District